Susanna Al-Hassan or Susan Alhassan (27 November 1927 – 17 January 1997) was a Ghanaian author and politician, who in 1961 became Ghana's first female to be appointed minister. She was the first African woman to hold a cabinet portfolio and became the member of parliament for the then Northern Region parliamentary constituency between 1960 and 1966. She also wrote several children's books.

Early life and education
Al-Hassan was born in Tamale and educated at Achimota School. From 1955 to 1960 she was headmistress of Bolgatanga Girls' Middle School.
She is the mother of former GTV News anchor Selma Ramatu Alhassan who later became Selma Valcourt, Victor Alhassan of Sky Petroleum, Kassem Alhassan and Tihiiru Alhassan.

Career
A beneficiary of the 1960 Representation of the People's (Women Members) Bill, Al-Hassan was returned unopposed as an MP representing the Northern Region in June 1960. She took on various ministerial position, some of which lasted for short periods whiles others were merged or expanded. From 1961 to 1963, she was the Deputy Minister of Education in Nkrumah's republican government. From 1963 to 1966, and again in 1967, she was Minister of Social Affairs. In between that period in 1965, Nkrumah appointed her as Minister of Social Welfare and Community Development.

On the fight against prostitution in northern Ghana, in the 1960s, the CPP government engaged in mass education campaigns that emphasized the association of prostitution with "social evil", "enemy" and "crusade", among the aged and illiterate population. Al-Hassan asserted that the problem rather lay with "the soaring rate of depravity and lewdness among our younger generation especially school girls and young working girls" who traveled to Tamale for work or school.

Death 
Al-Hassan died on 17 January 1997. In 2007, she was commemorated on a 50th anniversary stamp by former President John Agyekum Kuffour, 10 years after her death.

Works
Issa and Amina, 1963
Asana and the magic calabash, Longman, 1963. Republished, 1998
Two tales, 1966
The river that became a lake : the building of the Volta Dam, 1979
The river that became a lake: The story of the Volta river project, 1979
Voices of wisdom, 1994
'The Role of Women in Politics in Ghana', Feminist Perspectives, Ottawa: MATCH International Centre, 1994, 9–18.

References

1927 births
1997 deaths
Ghanaian MPs 1956–1965
Ghanaian MPs 1965–1966
Government ministers of Ghana
Ghanaian children's writers
Ghanaian women children's writers
20th-century Ghanaian women writers
Alumni of Achimota School
Convention People's Party (Ghana) politicians
Dagomba people
20th-century Ghanaian women politicians
Women government ministers of Ghana
Women members of the Parliament of Ghana
People from Tamale, Ghana